Jiaocheng (Foochow Romanized: Ciĕu-siàng) is a district of Ningde, Fujian province, PRC. Also called Ningde Shiqu (宁德市区 - Ningde Centre), the district seats the municipality's executive, legislature and judiciary, together with its Communist Party and Public Security Bureau.

Situation
Jiaocheng is bordered by Xiapu and Pingnan counties to the east and west, Zhouning County and Fu'an City to the north, and to the south by Fuzhou municipality's Gutian and Luoyuan counties.  A large deep-water bay Sandu Ao (Santuao) gives access to the East China Sea.

Administration
The district oversees two subdistricts, one Development zone, ten towns and four townships, of which one is an ethnic township designated for the native She people.

Subdistricts
Jiaonan Subdistrict
Jiaobei Subdistrict

Development zones
 Dongqiao

Towns
Chengnan
Zhangwan
Qidu
Badu
Jiudu
Feiluan
Sandu
Chixi
Huotong
Yangzhong
Hubei

Townships
Hongkou Township
Shihou Township
Jinhan She Ethnic Township

Transportation
Both Subdistricts, the Ethnic Township and the towns of Feiluan, Chengnan, Qidu and Badu lie on National Route 104, connecting south to Fengshan and north to Fu'an City centre.

Notes and references

County-level divisions of Fujian
Districts of China